The Alvis Leonides is a British air-cooled nine-cylinder radial aero engine first developed by Alvis Car and Engineering Company in 1936.

Design and development
Development of the nine-cylinder engine was led by Capt. George Thomas Smith-Clarke. The prototype engine, called 9ARS and which weighed 693 lb and developed 450 hp, was run in December 1936. In 1938 Airspeed (1934) Ltd lent their test pilot, George Errington, and their much rebuilt Bristol Bulldog (K3183), to carry out test flights. Development was continued at a reduced pace during the Second World War and following testing in an Airspeed Oxford and an Airspeed Consul (VX587). Alvis was ready to market the engine in 1947 as the Series 500 (502, 503 and sub-types) for aeroplanes and Series 520 for helicopters. (Most helicopter engines were direct drive — no reduction gearbox — with a centrifugal clutch and fan cooling). The first production use was the Percival Prince, which flew in July 1948 and the Westland Sikorsky S-51 and Westland WS-51 Dragonfly helicopters. From 1959 the stroke was increased to 4.8 inches for the Series 530 (mainly the Mk. 531 for Twin Pioneers) rated at 640 hp. It was Britain's last high-power production piston aero-engine when manufacture ceased in 1966.

Variants
Notes: LE designations from Air Ministry system ( where known); 500 series designations from Alvis company designation system; Mark numbers for civil variants.
Alvis 9ARS pre-war precursor to the Leonides – / 0.5:1 
LE.1M(Leonides 501/1) – /3,000 rpm/+6.6 lb boost/ 0.5:1 
LE.2M(Leonides 501/2) – 0.625:1 reduction gearing, remote accessories
LE.3M(Leonides 501/3) – 0.5:1 reduction gearing, remote accessories
LE.4M(Leonides 501/4) –  0.625:1 reduction gearing
LE.12HMH(Leonides 522/2) Horizontal direct-drive for helicopters
LE.21HMV(Leonides 522/1) Vertical direct-drive for helicopters
LE.23HM(Leonides 524/1) Vertical direct-drive for helicopters
LE.24HMV(Leonides 524/1) Vertical opposite rotation reduction-geared drive for helicopters
LE.25HMV(Leonides 523/1)
Leonides 501/3,000 rpm/+6.6 lb boost/ 0.5:1 
Leonides 502
Leonides 503
Leonides 504
Leonides 514
Leonides 521
Leonides 522
Leonides 523 Helicopter vertical drive
Leonides 524 Helicopter vertical drive
Leonides 525
Leonides 530 Long stroke
Leonides 531 Long stroke (+ 10mm), supercharger ratio 6.5:1
Leonides 532 Long stroke (+ 10mm), supercharger ratio 7.91:1
Leonides Mark 22(Leonides 503/2)
Leonides Mark 24(Leonides 503/4)
Leonides Mark 50(Leonides 521/2)
Leonides Mark 70(Leonides 523/1)
Leonides Mark 125(Leonides 504/5)
Leonides Mark 125 01/2(Leonides 503/5)
Leonides Mark 126(Leonides 503/6A)
Leonides Mark 127 01/2(Leonides 503/7A)
Leonides Mark 128(Leonides 504/8B)
Leonides Mark 130(Leonides 503/7)
Leonides Mark 138(Leonides 531/8B)  Long stroke (+ 10mm)
Leonides Mark 173(Leonides 524/1 & 525/1)

Applications
 Agusta AZ.8L 4x 503/2
 Bristol Sycamore — 1x Mk. 173, 550 hp (410 kW)
 Cunliffe-Owen Concordia — 2x LE.4M, 550 hp
 de Havilland Canada DHC-2 Beaver Mk.2 — 1x 502/4, 520 hp, 520shp (388 kW)
 Fairchild F-11-2 Husky — 1x 550 hp
 Fairey Gyrodyne — one 525 hp to drive rotor and propeller
 Fairey Jet Gyrodyne — one 525 hp to drive air compressor and propellers
 Fiat G.49-1 — 1x 502/4 Mk 24, 550 hp
 Handley Page H.P.R.2 Basic Trainer (WE505 only) — 1 x 502/4, 550 hp
 Harker Leo-cat — 1x 560 hp (418 kW)
 Percival P.50 Prince — 2 x 501/4, 502/4, 503 or 504, 520 hp
 Percival P.57 Sea Prince — 2 x Mk. 125, 550 hp
 Percival P.66 President — 2 x 503/7A, Mk 128 01/2, 540/560 hp (400–420 kW)
 Percival P.66 Pembroke — 2 x Mk. 127, 540 hp
 Percival Provost — 1x Mk. 126, 550 hp
 Server-Aero Leo-cat — 1x 560 hp (418 kW)
 Scottish Aviation Pioneer 2 — 1 x 503/7A, Mk 128 01/2, 520 hp
 Scottish Aviation Twin Pioneer CC.1 — 2 x 514/8, 550 hp
 Scottish Aviation Twin Pioneer CC.2 — 2 x 531/8,Mk138, 640 hp (564 kW)
 SR.N1 Hovercraft — the first hovercraft
 Westland Dragonfly — 1x 521/1, 520shp
 Westland Widgeon — 1x 521/1, 520shp

Survivors
A Leonides 126-powered Hunting Percival Provost (G-KAPW) with CAA permission to fly as XF603, owned by the Shuttleworth Trust and based at Old Warden, Bedfordshire is airworthy as of 2017, and is displayed to the public at home airshows during the airshow season.
The world's only surviving Gloster Gauntlet, formerly powered by a Bristol Mercury VI engine, is now powered by a Leonides 503.
A privately owned, Leonides-powered Percival Pembroke remains airworthy in March 2010.
Two privately owned Scottish Aviation Twin Pioneers are flying in Australia

Engines on display
Preserved Alvis Leonides engines are on public display at the following museums:
Fleet Air Arm Museum
Gatwick Aviation Museum
Midland Air Museum
Museum of Science and Industry (Manchester)
Royal Air Force Museum Cosford
Shuttleworth Collection
The Helicopter Museum (Weston)
Cornwall Aviation Heritage Centre
Solent Sky
East Midlands Aeropark

Specifications (Leonides)

See also

References
Notes

Bibliography

 Gunston, Bill. World Encyclopedia of Aero Engines. Cambridge, England. Patrick Stephens Limited, 1989. 
 Lumsden, Alec. British Piston Engines and their Aircraft. Marlborough, Wiltshire: Airlife Publishing, 2003. .

External links

  Scottish Aviation Twin Pioneer
 whl.co.uk (pages 6, 10 & 11)
 warbirdalley.com
 helicoptermuseum.co.uk
 virtualpilots.fi
 Beaver
 hovercraft-museum.org

Aircraft air-cooled radial piston engines
Leonides
1930s aircraft piston engines